Women's freestyle wrestling has been part of the World Wrestling Championships since 1987, and was first made an Olympic event in the 2004 Olympics. The World Wrestling Championships takes place during non Olympic years. At the World Wrestling Championships team scoring is kept, while no official team standings are kept for the Olympics.

World Level Champions in Women's Freestyle Wrestling by Year and Weight

1987–1996

1997–2001

2002–2003

2004

2005–2007

2008

2008–2011

2012

2012–2013

2014–2017

2018–2019

{| class="wikitable sortable" style="font-size: 90%"
|-
! Year !! Team !! width=300| 50 kg !! width=275| 53 kg !! width=300| 55 kg !! width=300| 57 kg!! width=300| 59 kg !! width=300| 62 kg !! width=300| 65 kg !! width=300| 68 kg !! width=300| 72 kg !! width=300| 76 kg
|-
| 2018 ||  ||  Susaki, Yui (2/4) ||  Okuno, Haruna (2/2) ||  Mukaida, Mayu (2/4) ||  Rong, Ningning (1/1) ||  Kawai, Risako (3/5) ||  Yusein, Taybe (1/1) ||  Olli, Petra (1/1)||  Cherkasova, Alla (1/1) ||  Di Stasio, Justina (1/1)||  Gray, Adeline (4/6)
|-
| 2019 ||  ||  Stadnik, Mariya (2/2) ||  Pak, Yong-mi (1/1) ||  Winchester, Jacarra (1/1) ||  Kawai, Risako (4/5) ||  Morais, Linda (1/1) ||  Tynybekova, Aisuluu (1/2) ||  Trazhukova, Inna (1/1) ||  Mensah-Stock, Tamyra (1/3) ||  Vorobieva, Natalia (3/3) ||  Gray, Adeline (5/6)

2021

2021–2022

Individual Multiple-Time World Level Champions

16 World Level Championships
 Saori Yoshida, 2002–2015

14 World Level Championships
 Kaori Ichō, 2002–2016

9 World Level Championships
 Hitomi Obara (Sakamoto), 2000–2012

6 World Level Championships
 Yayoi Urano, 1990–1996

 Christine Nordhagen, 1994–2001

 Adeline Gray, 2012–2021

5 World Level Championships
 Shoko Yoshimura, 1989–1995

 Liu Dongfeng, 1991–1996

 Zhong Xiue, 1991–1997

 Nikola Hartmann, 1993–2000

 Kyōko Hamaguchi, 1997–2003

 Stanka Zlateva, 2006–2011

 Risako Kawai, 2016–2021

Team Championships
The list below includes unofficial championships won during the Olympic Games, although no official team statistics are kept during Olympic years.

30 World Level Championships
 1988–2022

2 World Level Championships
 1995–1998

 2001–2012

1 World Level Championships
 1987

 1999

 2009

See also

List of Cadet, Junior, and Espoir World Champions in men's freestyle wrestling
United States results in men's freestyle wrestling
Soviet and Russian results in men's freestyle wrestling
List of World and Olympic Champions in men's freestyle wrestling
List of World and Olympic Champions in Greco-Roman wrestling

References
FILA Wrestling Database

Freestyle wrestling
Wrestling champions